The Rihn DR-107 One Design is an American aerobatic homebuilt aircraft that was designed by Dan Rihn and first flown in 1993. The aircraft is supplied by Aircraft Spruce & Specialty of Corona, California in the form of plans and a materials kit for amateur construction.

The DR-107 was designed as a low-cost one design aircraft for competition and sport basic to advanced aerobatics, including International Aerobatic Club Class One competitions. For this role it is stressed to +/-10g.

Design and development
The DR-107 is a monoplane that features a cantilever low-wing, a single-seat enclosed cockpit under a bubble canopy, fixed conventional landing gear with wheel pants and a single engine in tractor configuration.

The aircraft is predominantly made from wood, with some steel parts and doped aircraft fabric. The wing has almost full-span ailerons that produce rolls of 360° per second. The wing has no flaps.

The standard engines used are the  Lycoming O-360, modified with high compression pistons, an inverted oil system and fuel injection or the  Lycoming AEIO-320 powerplant.

The designer estimates the construction time from the supplied materials kit as 2000 hours.

Operational history
By 1998 the company reported that 355 kits had been sold and five aircraft were flying.

In November 2013 33 examples were registered in the United States with the Federal Aviation Administration, with another 11 previously registered and now removed. Also in November 2013 there were two registered with Transport Canada and ten in the United Kingdom with the Civil Aviation Authority.

Specifications (DR-107)

See also
List of aerobatic aircraft

References

External links

DR-107 “One Design” 25th Anniversary Presentation at Oshkosh 2018 by Dan Rihn

DR-107
1990s United States sport aircraft
Single-engined tractor aircraft
Low-wing aircraft
Homebuilt aircraft
Aerobatic aircraft